The 2022 Maryland House of Delegates election was held on November 8, 2022, electing all 141 members of the chamber. This coincided with the election of all 47 of Maryland's state senators, along with other statewide offices. The Democratic and Republican primaries were held on July 19, 2022.

Overview

Summary by district

Retiring incumbents

Democrats 
20 Democrats retired.

District 3A: Carol L. Krimm retired.
District 3A: Karen Lewis Young retired to run for state senator in District 3.
District 10: Benjamin Brooks retired to run for state senator in District 10.
District 10: Jay Jalisi retired to run for state senator in District 10. 
District 13: Shane Pendergrass retired.
District 17: James W. Gilchrist retired.
District 18: Alfred C. Carr Jr. retired to run for Montgomery County Council in District 4.
District 23A: Geraldine Valentino-Smith retired.
District 23B: Cheryl S. Landis retired.
District 24: Faye Martin Howell retired.
District 26: Jay Walker retired.
District 31A: Ned Carey retired.
District 34A: Mary Ann Lisanti retired to run for state senator in District 34.
District 43: Curt Anderson retired.
District 43: Maggie McIntosh retired.
District 44A: Roxane L. Prettyman retired.
District 44B: Pat Young retired to run for the Baltimore County Council in District 1.
District 45: Talmadge Branch retired.
District 46: Brooke Lierman retired to run for comptroller.
District 47B: Wanika B. Fisher retired to run for the Prince George's County Council in District 2.

Republicans
10 Republicans retired.

District 1A: Wendell R. Beitzel retired.
District 1C: Mike McKay retired to run for state senator in District 1.
District 2A: Neil Parrott retired to run for Congress in Maryland's 6th congressional district.
District 4: Dan Cox retired to run for governor.
District 5: Susan W. Krebs retired.
District 5: Haven Shoemaker retired to run for Carroll County state's attorney.
District 9A: Reid Novotny retired to run for state senator in District 9.
District 29C: Jerry Clark retired.
District 33: Sid Saab retired to run for state senator in District 33.
District 37B: Johnny Mautz retired to run for state senator in District 37.

Predictions

Incumbents defeated

In primaries

Democrats
 District 11B: Lisa Belcastro lost renomination to Jon S. Cardin and Dana Stein.
 District 27A: Susie Proctor lost renomination to Kevin Harris.
 District 27B: Rachel Jones lost renomination to Jeffrie Long.
 District 45: Chanel Branch lost renomination to Jackie Addison, Stephanie M. Smith, and Caylin Young.

Republicans
 District 7A: Joseph C. Boteler III lost renomination to Kathy Szeliga and Ryan Nawrocki.
 District 7B: Richard Impallaria lost renomination to Lauren Arikan.

In the general election

Republicans
 District 2B: Brenda J. Thiam lost to Brooke Grossman.
 District 9A: Trent Kittleman lost to Natalie Ziegler and Chao Wu.

List of districts

All election results are from the Maryland Board of Elections.

District 1A

The new District 1A encompasses all of Garrett County and part of Allegany County. Four-term Republican incumbent Wendell R. Beitzel, who was re-elected in 2018 with 77.6 percent of the vote, announced on August 9, 2021, that he would not run for re-election to a fifth term.

District 1B

The new District 1B encompasses the city of Cumberland and parts of Frostburg, both in Allegany County. Two-term Republican incumbent Jason C. Buckel, who was re-elected in 2018 with 62.6 percent of the vote, is running for a third term unopposed.

District 1C

The new District 1C includes east Allegany and west Washington counties. Two-term Republican incumbent Mike McKay, who was re-elected in 2018 with 82.1 percent of the vote, announced on July 21, 2021, that he would run for state Senate instead of seeking a third term.

District 2A

The new District 2A includes east Washington and north Frederick counties. While two-term Republican incumbent William J. Wivell, who was re-elected in 2018 with 34.7 percent of the vote, is running for a third term, two-term Republican incumbent Neil Parrott, who was re-elected in 2018 with 40.0 percent of the vote, announced on November 17, 2021, that he would run for Congress in Maryland's 6th congressional district instead of running for a third term.

District 2B

The new District 2B encompasses the city of Hagerstown in Washington County. Republican incumbent Brenda J. Thiam is running for a full term after being appointed to the seat on October 6, 2020, following the appointment of Paul D. Corderman, who was re-elected in 2018 with 51.9 percent of the vote, to the Maryland Senate.

District 3

The new 3rd district encompasses the city of Frederick in Frederick County. The 2020 redistricting cycle saw districts 3A and 3B merge to form one district. First-term Democratic incumbent Kenneth P. Kerr, who was re-elected in 2018 with 52.4 percent of the vote, is running for re-election, while two-term incumbents Karen Lewis Young and Carol L. Krimm, who were re-elected in 2018 with 31.4 and 31.3 percent of the vote respectively, are retiring. Young announced on June 26, 2021, that she would run for state Senate in District 3 instead of seeking a third term.

District 4

The new 4th district includes most of Frederick County, not including the northern part of the county nor the city of Frederick. Two-term incumbent Barrie Ciliberti and first-term incumbent Jesse Pippy, both Republicans who won with 19.7 and 19.2 percent of the vote respectively, are running for their third and second terms respectively, while first-term Republican incumbent Dan Cox, who was elected in 2018 with 20.6 percent of the vote, announced on July 4, 2021, that he would run for governor.

District 5

The new 5th district encompasses most of Carroll County, including Eldersburg and Westminster. Two-term incumbent April Rose, who was re-elected in 2018 with 26.8 percent of the vote, is running for a third term, while two-term incumbents Susan W. Krebs and Haven Shoemaker, who were re-elected in 2018 with 30.9 and 26.5 percent of the vote respectively, are retiring. Shoemaker announced on July 20, 2021, that he would run for Carroll County state's attorney instead of a third term.

District 6

The new 6th district encompasses southeast Baltimore County, including Dundalk, Essex, and Edgemere. Two-term Republican incumbents Robert B. Long, Robin Grammer Jr., and Richard W. Metzgar, who were re-elected in 2018 with 19.7, 19.5, and 19.2 percent of the vote respectively, are all running for re-election to a third term.

District 7A

Following the 2020 redistricting cycle, District 7 was split into two districts, 7A and 7B. 8th District incumbent Joseph C. Boteler III, who was elected in 2018 with 16.7 percent of the vote, was drawn into the new District 7A, where he is running for a second term. Kathy Szeliga, who was re-elected in 2018 with 25.4 percent of the vote, is running for a third term in District 7A. The new District 7A encompasses east Baltimore County, including Kingsville and Bowleys Quarters.

District 7B

Following the 2020 redistricting cycle, District 7 was split into two districts, 7A and 7B. First-term incumbent Lauren Arikan and fifth-term incumbent Richard Impallaria, both Republicans who won in 2018 with 23.3 and 22.5 percent of the vote respectively, are running for re-election to a second and sixth term. The new 7B district runs along the borders of Baltimore and Harford counties.

District 8

The new 8th district consists of part of Baltimore County, including Perry Hall and Parkville. Democratic incumbents Carl W. Jackson, who was appointed to the seat on October 21, 2019, following the resignation of state delegate Eric M. Bromwell, and first-term incumbent Harry Bhandari, who was elected in 2018 with 17.7 percent of the vote, are running for re-election. Republican incumbent Joseph C. Boteler III was redrawn into District 7A, where he is running for a second term.

District 9A

The new District 9A encompasses north Howard County, including Cooksville, Lisbon, and Clarksville, and part of Montgomery County. Two-term Republican incumbent Trent Kittleman, who was re-elected in 2018 with 30.6 percent of the vote, is running for a third term while Reid Novotny, who was appointed to the seat on January 13, 2021, following the resignation of Warren E. Miller, announced on January 11, 2022, that he would run for state Senate instead of seeking a full term.

District 9B

The new District 9B includes all of Ellicott City in Howard County. First-term Democratic incumbent Courtney Watson, who was elected in 2018 with 57.4 percent of the vote, is running for a second term.

District 10

The new 10th district encompasses east Baltimore County, including Randallstown and Reisterstown. Six-term Democratic incumbent Adrienne A. Jones, who was re-elected in 2018 with 27.4 percent of the vote, is running for a seventh term, while two-term Democratic incumbents 
Benjamin Brooks and Jay Jalisi, who were re-elected in 2018 with 26.8 and 26.4 percent of the vote respectively, both announced that they would both run for state Senate to the 10th district instead of seek a third term.

District 11A

Following the 2020 redistricting cycle, District 11 was split into two districts, 11A and 11B. All incumbents were drawn into 11B, creating an open seat. The new District 11A encompasses central Baltimore County, stretching from Garrison to Cockeysville.

District 11B

Following the 2020 redistricting cycle, District 11 was split into two districts, 11A and 11B. The new District 11B encompasses central Baltimore County, including Pikesville and Mays Chapel. First-term incumbent Jon S. Cardin and four-term incumbent Dana Stein, both Democrats who were elected in 2018 with 29.3 and 26.9 percent of the vote respectively, and incumbent Lisa Belcastro, who was appointed to the seat on March 10, 2020, after Shelly L. Hettleman was appointed to the Maryland Senate, are running for re-election.

District 12A

Following the 2020 redistricting cycle, District 12 was split into two districts, 12A and 12B. The new District 12A encompasses part of Howard County, including Columbia and Hanover. Two-term incumbent Terri L. Hill and first-term incumbent Jessica M. Feldmark, who won election in 2018 with 21.8 and 21.9 percent of the vote respectively, are running for re-election.

District 12B

Following the 2020 redistricting cycle, District 12 was split into two districts, 12A and 12B. The new District 12B encompasses part of north Anne Arundel County, including parts of Brooklyn Park and Glen Burnie. Two-term Democratic incumbent Ned Carey, who was re-elected in 2018 with 56.8 percent of the vote, was drawn into District 12B from District 31A, but announced on April 15, 2022, that he would not seek re-election to a third term.

District 13

The new 13th district encompasses south Howard County. Two-term incumbent Vanessa Atterbeary and first-term incumbent Jennifer R. Terrasa, who were re-elected in 2018 with 30.7 and 27.1 percent of the vote respectively, are running for re-election. Seven-term Democratic incumbent Shane Pendergrass, who was re-elected in 2018 with 28.4 percent of the vote, announced on November 29, 2021, that she would not run for re-election to an eighth term.

District 14

The new 14th district runs along the border of Howard and Montgomery counties, including Olney. Fifth-term incumbent Anne Kaiser, first-term incumbent Pamela E. Queen, and three-term incumbent Eric Luedtke, all Democrats who won re-election in 2018 with 24.5, 23.4, and 22.8 percent of the vote respectively, are running for re-election.

District 15

The new 15th district encompasses east Montgomery County, including North Potomac and parts of Germantown. First-term incumbent Lily Qi and two-term incumbent David Fraser-Hidalgo, both Democrats who were elected in 2018 with 23.6 and 22.9 percent of the vote respectively, and incumbent Linda Foley, who was appointed to the seat on December 17, 2021, following the resignation of state delegate Kathleen Dumais, are all running for re-election.

District 16

The new 16th district consists of south Montgomery County, including Potomac and parts of Bethesda. Three-term incumbent Ariana Kelly, two-term incumbent Marc Korman, and first-term incumbent Sara N. Love, all Democrats who were elected in 2018 with 30.6, 29.4, and 29.4 percent of the vote, are running for re-election unopposed.

District 17

The new 17th district consists of Rockville and Gaithersburg. Eight-term incumbent Kumar P. Barve and first-term incumbent Julie Palakovich Carr, both Democrats who were elected in 2018 with 30.5 and 29.5 percent of the vote respectively, are running for re-election. Four-term Democratic incumbent James W. Gilchrist announced on September 3, 2021, that he would not seek re-election to a fifth term in 2022.

District 18

The new 18th district consists of Bethesda, Chevy Chase, Wheaton, and Kensington. First-term Democratic incumbents Emily Shetty and Jared Solomon, who were elected in 2018 with 30.4 and 28.0 percent of the vote respectively, are running for a second term.

Four-term Democratic incumbent Alfred C. Carr Jr., who won re-election in 2018 with 30.1 percent of the vote, announced on April 15, 2022, that he would not run for re-election for a fifth term and would instead run for the Montgomery County Council in District 4. Carr made this announcement hours before the Board of Elections' candidate filing deadline, so no candidates were able to file to run for the District 18 House seat left open by Carr. As a result, the Montgomery County Democratic Central Committee voted on April 21, 2022, to select Aaron Kaufman to run for the seat.

District 19 

The new 19th district includes Aspen Hill, Leisure World, and Redland. First-term Democratic incumbents Charlotte Crutchfield and Vaughn Stewart, and third-term incumbent Bonnie Cullison, all of who were elected in 2018 with 25.7, 24.3, and 25.1 percent of the vote respectively, are running for re-election in 2022.

District 20 

The new 20th district includes Silver Spring, White Oak, and Takoma Park. Two-term Democratic incumbent David Moon and first-term incumbents Jheanelle Wilkins and Lorig Charkoudian, who were elected in 2018 with 35.0, 33.1, and 31.3 percent of the vote respectively, are all running for re-election.

District 21

The new 21st district includes parts of Prince George's and Anne Arundel counties, including College Park, Laurel, and Beltsville. First-term Democratic incumbent Mary A. Lehman and four-term incumbents Ben Barnes and Joseline Peña-Melnyk, who were elected in 2018 with 26.3, 25.7, and 25.6 percent of the vote respectively, are all running for re-election unopposed.

District 22

The new 22nd district consists of Hyattsville, Greenbelt, and Riverdale Park. Two-term Democratic incumbents Alonzo T. Washington and eight-term incumbent Anne Healey, who were re-elected in 2018 with 31.2 and 29.9 percent of the vote respectively, and incumbent Nicole A. Williams, who was appointed to the seat on December 6, 2019, following the resignation of Tawanna P. Gaines, are all running for re-election.

District 23

Following the 2020 redistricting cycle, House of Delegates districts 23A and 23B were merged into one district. The new 23rd district runs along the border of Prince George's and Anne Arundel counties, including Upper Marlboro, Bowie, and South Laurel. Fifth-term incumbent Marvin E. Holmes Jr., who was re-elected in 2018 with 48.3 percent of the vote, is running for a sixth term, while third-term incumbent Geraldine Valentino-Smith, who was re-elected in 2018 with 74.9 percent of the vote, and Cheryl S. Landis, who was appointed to the seat on October 8, 2021, after Ron Watson was appointed to the Maryland Senate in District 23, are both not seeking re-election in 2022.

District 24

The new 24th district consists of Seat Pleasant, Springdale, and Lake Arbor. First-term Democratic incumbents Andrea Harrison and Jazz Lewis, who were elected in 2018 with 31.7 and 31.0 percent of the vote respectively, are both running for re-election. Faye Martin Howell, who was appointed to the seat on November 12, 2021, after Erek Barron resigned to be sworn in as the United States Attorney for the District of Maryland, did not file to run for re-election in 2022.

District 25

The new 25th district consists of Forestville, Westphalia, and Kettering. Two-term Democratic incumbent Darryl Barnes and first-term incumbent Nick Charles, who won re-election in 2018 with 34.8 and 31.5 percent of the vote respectively, and incumbent Karen Toles, who was appointed to the seat on January 12, 2022, after Dereck E. Davis was elected Treasurer of Maryland, are all running for re-election unopposed.

District 26

The new 26th district consists of Friendly, Oxon Hill, and Fort Washington. First-term Democratic incumbent Veronica L. Turner and four-term incumbent Kris Valderrama, who were elected in 2018 with 35.1 and 32.0 percent of the vote, are running for re-election, while four-term incumbent Jay Walker announced on March 2, 2022, that he would not seek re-election to a fifth term in 2022.

District 27A

The new District 27A encompasses part of north Charles and south Prince George's counties, including Waldorf, Bryantown, and Danville. First-term Democratic incumbent Susie Proctor, who was elected to a full term in 2018 with 98.2 percent of the vote, is running for a second term.

District 27B

The new District 27B encompasses parts of south Prince George's and north Calvert counties, including Chesapeake Beach and Baden. Democratic incumbent Rachel Jones, who was appointed to the seat on February 17, 2021, after Michael Jackson was appointed to the Maryland Senate in district 27, is running for a full term.

District 27C

The new District 27C encompasses most of Calvert County, excluding its northernmost and southernmost points. Three-term Republican incumbent Mark N. Fisher, who was re-elected in 2018 with 55.8 percent of the vote, is running for a fourth term.

District 28

The new 28th district encompasses most of Charles County. First-term Democratic incumbent Debra Davis, two-term incumbent Edith J. Patterson, and third-term incumbent C. T. Wilson, who were all elected in 2018 with 23.8, 23.2, and 22.8 percent of the vote respectively, are all running for re-election.

District 29A

The new District 29A encompasses north St. Mary's County, including Charlotte Hall and Leonardtown. Two-term Republican incumbent Matthew Morgan, who was re-elected in 2018 with 69.0 percent of the vote, is running for a third term unopposed.

District 29B

The new District 29B encompasses south St. Mary's County, including California, Scotland, and Lexington Park. First-term Democratic incumbent Brian M. Crosby, who was elected in 2018 with 53.4 percent of the vote, is running for a second term.

District 29C

The new District 29C includes central St. Mary's and south Calvert counties, including Lusby, Beauvue, and Drayden. First-term Republican incumbent Jerry Clark, who was re-elected in 2018 with 57.0 percent of the vote, announced on January 12, 2022, that he would not seek re-election to a second term in 2022.

District 30A

The new District 30A includes the city of Annapolis and surrounding areas. Democratic incumbents Dana Jones, who was appointed to the seat on May 1, 2020, following the resignation of state delegate Alice J. Cain, and Shaneka Henson, who was appointed to the seat on May 16, 2019, following the resignation of state delegate Michael E. Busch, are both running for re-election to their first full terms.

District 30B

The new District 30B includes south Anne Arundel County, including Friendship, Lothian, and Galesville. Two-term Republican incumbent Seth A. Howard, who was re-elected in 2018 with 54.4 percent of the vote, is running for a third term.

District 31

Following the 2020 redistricting cycle, House of Delegates districts 31A and 31B were merged into one district. The new 31st district encompasses north Anne Arundel County, including Pasadena, Severn, and Gambrills. First-term Republican incumbent Brian Chisholm and four-term incumbent Nic Kipke, who were elected in 2018 with 33.2 and 33.0 percent of the vote respectively, are running for re-election. 33rd district incumbent Rachel Muñoz, who was appointed to the seat on November 8, 2021, following the resignation of Michael E. Malone, was also drawn into the 31st district, where she is running for re-election to a full term in 2022.

District 32

The new 32nd district encompasses part of north Anne Arundel County, including Glen Burnie and Fort Meade. Two-term Democratic incumbent Mark S. Chang and first-term incumbents J. Sandy Bartlett and Mike Rogers, who were elected in 2018 with 20.9, 20.7, and 19.9 percent of the vote respectively, are all running for re-election.

District 33A

Following the 2020 redistricting cycle, District 33 was split into three districts, 33A, 33B, and 33C. The new District 33A encompasses part of Anne Arundel County, including parts of Odenton and Gambrills. Two-term Republican incumbent Sid Saab, who was re-elected in 2018 with 16.5 percent of the vote, announced on April 11, 2022, that he would run for state Senate instead of seeking a third term.

District 33B

Following the 2020 redistricting cycle, District 33 was split into three districts, 33A, 33B, and 33C. The new District 33B encompasses part of Anne Arundel County, including Crofton, Davidsonville, and Crownsville. Republican incumbent Rachel Muñoz, who was appointed to the seat on November 8, 2021, was redrawn into the 33rd district, creating an open seat.

District 33C

Following the 2020 redistricting cycle, District 33 was split into three districts, 33A, 33B, and 33C. The new District 33C encompasses part of Anne Arundel County, including Cape Saint Claire and Severna Park. First-term Democratic incumbent Heather Bagnall, who was elected in 2018 with 16.1 percent of the vote, is running for a second term in 2022.

District 34A

The new District 34A encompasses south Harford County, including Edgewood, Aberdeen, and Havre de Grace. First-term Democratic incumbent Steven C. Johnson, who was elected in 2018 with 24.9 percent of the vote, is running for a second term, while first-term incumbent Mary Ann Lisanti, who was elected in 2018 with 28.5 of the vote, is running for state Senate in District 34 instead of seeking a third term.

District 34B

The new District 34B encompasses part of Harford County, including Bel Air, Glenwood, and Constant Friendship. Two-term Republican incumbent Susan K. McComas, who was re-elected in 2018 with 65.0 percent of the vote, is running for re-election to a third term.

=

District 35A

The new District 35A encompasses most of Harford County, including Churchville, Pylesville, and Hickory, and part of Cecil County. Two-term Republican incumbent Teresa E. Reilly, who was re-elected in 2018 with 33.2 percent of the vote, and incumbent Mike Griffith, who was appointed to the seat following the resignation of Andrew Cassilly, are both running for re-election unopposed.

District 35B

The new District 35B encompasses part of Cecil County, including Rising Sun and North East. Two-term Republican incumbent Kevin Hornberger, who was re-elected in 2018 with 63.2 percent of the vote, is running for re-election to a third term.

District 36

The new 36th district encompasses all of Kent and Queen Anne's counties, and parts of Cecil and Caroline counties, including Elkton. Two-term Republican incumbent Steven J. Arentz, three-term incumbent Jay Jacobs, and two-term incumbent Jefferson L. Ghrist, who won re-election in 2018 with 22.6, 22.5, and 21.1 percent of the vote respectively, are all running for re-election unopposed.

District 37A

The new District 37A encompasses parts of Wicomico and Dorchester counties, including Salisbury, Hebron, and Cambridge. Two-term Democratic incumbent Sheree Sample-Hughes, who was re-elected in 2018 with 68.5 percent of the vote, is running for re-election to a third term.

District 37B

The new District 37B encompasses all of Talbot County and parts of Caroline, Dorchester, and Wicomico counties. Two-term Republican incumbent Christopher T. Adams, who was re-elected in 2018 with 33.9 percent of the vote, is running for a third term. Two-term Republican incumbent Johnny Mautz announced on February 16, 2022, that he would run for state Senate instead of seeking a third term.

District 38A

The new District 38A encompasses all of Somerset County and parts of Worcester and Wicomico counties, including Berlin, Princess Anne, and Pocomoke City. Three-term Republican incumbent Charles J. Otto, who was re-elected in 2018 with 59.4 percent of the vote, is running for a fourth term in 2022.

District 38B

The new District 38B includes the city of Salisbury in Wicomico County. Two-term Republican incumbent Carl Anderton Jr., who was re-elected in 2018 with 94.3 percent of the vote, is running for a third term unopposed.

District 38C

The new District 38C includes east Wicomico County and most of Worcester County, including Pittsville, Ocean City, and Assateague Island. First-term Republican incumbent Wayne A. Hartman, who was elected in 2018 with 95.4 percent of the vote, is running for a second term unopposed.

District 39

The new 39th district includes Montgomery Village and parts of Germantown and Clarksburg. First-term Democratic incumbents Gabriel Acevero and Lesley Lopez and three-term incumbent Kirill Reznik, who were elected in 2018 with 31.0, 30.1, and 27.4 percent of the vote respectively, are running for re-election.

District 40

The new 40th district encompasses communities in west Baltimore, including Morrell Park, Sandtown-Winchester, and Greenspring. First-term Democratic incumbent Melissa Wells and four-term incumbent Frank M. Conaway Jr., who were elected in 2018 with 29.3 and 25.9 percent of the vote respectively, and incumbent Marlon Amprey, who was appointed to the seat on January 13, 2021, after Nick Mosby was elected to the Baltimore City Council, are running for re-election in 2022.

District 41

The new 41st district encompasses communities in west Baltimore, including Wyndhurst, Yale Heights, and Edmondson. First-term Democratic incumbents Dalya Attar and Tony Bridges and ten-term incumbent Samuel I. Rosenberg, who were elected in 2018 with 31.3, 30.9, and 31.0 percent of the vote respectively, are running for re-election.

District 42A

The new District 42A encompasses north Baltimore County, including Glencoe, Hereford, and Phoenix. District 42B incumbent Nino Mangione, who was elected in 2018 with 28.6 percent of the vote, was drawn into the new District 42A, where he is running for a second term.

District 42B

The new District 42B includes communities in central Baltimore County, including Timonium, Hampton, and Phoenix. First-term Democratic incumbent Michele Guyton, who was elected in 2018 with 26.5 percent of the vote, is running for a second term.

District 42C

The new District 42C encompasses east Carroll County, including Hampstead, Finksburg, and Mexico.

District 43A

Following the 2020 redistricting cycle, District 43 was split into two districts, 43A and 43B. The new District 43A encompasses neighborhoods in north Baltimore, including Glen Oaks, Charles Village, and Northwood. First-term Democratic incumbent Regina T. Boyce, who was elected in 2018 with 32.0 percent of the vote, is running for re-election to a second term. Fifth-term incumbents Maggie McIntosh and Curt Anderson, who were re-elected in 2018 with 31.8 and 27.2 percent of the vote respectively, announced that they would not seek re-election to a sixth term in 2022.

District 43B

Following the 2020 redistricting cycle, District 43 was split into two districts, 43A and 43B. The new District 43B encompasses the city of Towson in central Baltimore County. District 42A incumbent Cathi Forbes, who was appointed to the seat on October 29, 2019, following the resignation of Stephen W. Lafferty, was drawn into the new District 43B, where she is running for her first full term.

District 44A

The new District 44A encompasses part of Baltimore County, including Baltimore Highlands and Catonsville. Democratic incumbent Roxane L. Prettyman, who was appointed to the seat on August 23, 2021, following the resignation of Keith E. Haynes, did not file to run for re-election to a full term. 12th District incumbent Eric Ebersole was drawn into the new District 44A, where he is running for re-election to a third term.

District 44B

The new District 44B includes neighborhoods in southwest Baltimore County, including Woodlawn, Arbutus, and Catonsville. Democratic incumbent Sheila Ruth, who was appointed to the seat on January 31, 2020, after Charles E. Sydnor III was appointed to the Maryland Senate, is running for re-election while two-term incumbent Pat Young announced on May 10, 2021, that he would not seek re-election to a third term, instead running for the Baltimore County Council in District 1 in 2022.

District 45

The new 45th district encompasses neighborhoods in central and east Baltimore, including Broadway East, Frankford, and Armistead Gardens. First-term Democratic incumbent Stephanie M. Smith, who was elected in 2018 with 27.3 percent of the vote, and incumbent Chanel Branch, who was appointed to the seat on January 28, 2020, after the resignation of Cheryl Glenn, are running for re-election. Seven-term incumbent Talmadge Branch, who was re-elected in 2018 with 26.2 percent of the vote, announced on April 15, 2022, that he would not seek re-election to an eighth term in 2022.

District 46

The new 46th district encompasses neighborhoods in central and south Baltimore, including the Inner Harbor, Bayview, and Curtis Bay. Three-term Democratic incumbent Luke Clippinger and first-term incumbent Robbyn Lewis, who were re-elected in 2018 with 27.8 and 27.3 percent of the vote respectively, are running for re-election. Two-term incumbent Brooke Lierman, who received 28.6 percent of the vote in 2018, announced on December 17, 2020, that she would run for Comptroller rather than seek a third term in 2022.

Republicans J. Brian Voss and Mekkah X. Mohammed ran unopposed in the primary, but were disqualified from running in the general election.

District 47A

The new District 47A is includes several Prince George's County communities, including Landover, Chillum, and Mount Rainier. First-term Democratic incumbent Julian Ivey and two-term incumbent Diana M. Fennell, who were elected in 2018 with 52.2 and 46.4 percent of the vote respectively, are running for a second term unopposed.

District 47B

The new District 47B is includes several Prince George's County communities, including Langley Park, University Park, and Adelphi. First-term Democratic incumbent Wanika B. Fisher, who was elected in 2018 with 99.1 percent of the vote, announced on June 9, 2021, that she would run for the Prince George's County Council in District 2 rather than seek a second term in 2022.

See also
2022 Maryland gubernatorial election
2022 Maryland Comptroller election
2022 Maryland Attorney General election
2022 Maryland Senate election

Notes

References

House of Delegates
Maryland House of Delegates
Maryland House of Delegates elections